Ahihud is the name of two biblical figures. In English, both figures are called "Ahihud," which represents two different names in Hebrew.

 Ahihud ( ’), a son of Bela, the son of Benjamin.
 Ahihud ( ’), father of Judah. Ahihud was chief of the tribe of Asher; one of those appointed by Moses to superintend the division of Canaan.

Book of Numbers people